Park Hee-gon (born 1969) is a South Korean film director and screenwriter.

Filmography 
R. U. Ready? (2002) - producer-director
Insadong Scandal (2009) - director, screenwriter
Perfect Game (2011) - director, screenwriter
Catman (2016) - director
Fengshui (2018) - director, script editor

References

External links 
 
 
 

1969 births
Living people
South Korean film directors
South Korean screenwriters